José Eusebio Caro Ibáñez (March 5, 1817 – January 28, 1853) was a Colombian writer, journalist, and politician. He was born in Ocaña, Norte de Santander and studied law at the Colegio de San Bartolomé in Bogota. Married to Blasina Tobar Finch in 1843, he was the father of future Colombian president Miguel Antonio Caro as well as future first lady Margarita Caro Tobar, the wife of another president Carlos Holguin Mallarino.

Career 
He was a co-founder of the Colombian Conservative Party. As a writer, his most notable works were only published after his death. Among these are his letters, philosophical writings and poetry.

Personal life 
He died in Santa Marta.

References

Colombian politicians
1817 births
1853 deaths